Crowders is a  neighborhood on the southside of Gastonia in Gaston County, North Carolina, United States.

References

Unincorporated communities in North Carolina
Unincorporated communities in Gaston County, North Carolina